Waterstad FM is a regional Dutch commercial radio station. Waterstad FM takes its name from "the city of waters", where the station for the first time on the cable could be heard, namely Sneek.

History
Waterstad FM was founded in 2000. After the spectrum auction in 2003, Waterstad FM started broadcasting in Friesland and the Noordoostpolder.

On 1 November 2007, Waterstad FM was acquired  by the NDC Mediagroep. It managed Waterstad FM, RadioNL and Freez FM through its subsidiary NDC Radio.

On 1 May 2013, NDC Mediagroep sold its radio stations to Beheer Regionale Radio, operator of TV Oranje.

Format
Initially, Waterstad FM was a non-stop music channel. Since September 2010, it also features presented programs.

Regional news on Waterstad FM is provided in cooperation with editors of the Leeuwarder Courant and Dagblad van het Noorden.

References

External links
 Official website 

Radio stations in the Netherlands